Kiran Kandolkar is an Indian politician from the state of Goa. He is a first term member of the Goa Legislative Assembly representing the Tivim constituency. He was the president of All India Trinamool Congress Goa state unit, until his resignation after the defeat of the All India Trinamool Congress in the 2022 Goa Legislative Assembly Election.

Posts
He was the chairman of the  Goa State Horticulture Corporation.

Committees in the Goa Legislative Assembly
He is a member of the following committees in the house 
Member		Select Committee on The Goa Land Use
Member		Committee on Privileges
Member		Committee On Government Assurances
Member		Committee On Petitions
Member		Select Committee on The Goa School Education

External links 
 Member of the Goa Legislative Assembly
Bharatiya Janata Party Members of the Goa Legislative Assembly

References 

Members of the Goa Legislative Assembly
Living people
People from North Goa district
Bharatiya Janata Party politicians from Goa
Year of birth missing (living people)
Maharashtrawadi Gomantak Party politicians
Goa Forward Party politicians
Trinamool Congress politicians from Goa